Cotman may refer to
Cotman (surname)
Cotman's Ash, a hamlet in Kent, England
Cotman v Brougham, a 1918 UK company law case